AK Pictoris is a star system in the constellation Pictor. Its combined apparent magnitude is 6.182. Based on the system's parallax, it is located 69 light-years (21.3 parsecs) away. AK Pictoris is a member of the AB Doradus moving group, a group of stars with similar motions that are thought to be associated.

AK Pictoris is a binary star. Its two stars orbit each other every 217.6 years, separated by 2.004. The primary star is a G-type star with similar properties to the Sun. The secondary star is a K-type star. The primary star is a young BY Draconis variable, a class of variable stars that derive their variability from stellar rotation. It is also known to host a debris disk, inferred from its infrared excess.

References

Pictor (constellation)
Pictoris, AK
3400
048189
031711
2466
G-type main-sequence stars
K-type main-sequence stars
BY Draconis variables
Durchmusterung objects
Binary stars